Pentanenitrile, valeronitrile or butyl cyanide is a nitrile with the formula C4H9CN. This can be written BuCN, with Bu representing an n-butyl (linear butyl group).

Production
Pentanenitrile can be produced by heating 1-chlorobutane with sodium cyanide in dimethyl sulfoxide. This reaction takes about 20 minutes, keeping the temperature below 160 °C. The yield is about 93%.

Another way to get the substance is by heating valeraldehyde with hydroxylamine.

Pentanenitrile is contained in bone oil.

Properties
The pentanenitrile molecule is flexible and can adopt a number of different conformers, so that it will naturally be a mixture. These conformers are called anti-anti (30%), anti-gauche (46%), gauche-anti, gauche-gauche-cis, and gauche-gauche-trans.

Biology
Pentanenitrile is toxic to animals, and produces its action by the liberation of cyanide by cytochrome P450. The cyanide is detoxified and excreted in urine as thiocyanate.

Pentanenitrile is found in Brassica species and varieties such as broccoli.

Pentanenitrile is hydrolyzed to valeric acid by the fungi Gibberella intermedia, Fusarium oxysporum, and Aspergillus niger in which it induces production of the nitrilase enzyme.

References

5